The three brothers Bahattin, Sinan and Kenan Sofuoğlu have been some of the most successful Turkish motorcycle racers. Their father Irfan Basri Sofuoğlu, a motorcycle enthusiast since 1965, ran a motorcycle repair shop in the Kuzuluk town of Akyazı district in the Sakarya Province. The family moved 1992 to Adapazarı, where the father opened up a motorcycle dealer and repair shop.

Bahattin Sofuoğlu (1 January 1978, Adapazarı, Turkey – 25 October 2002) was a successful motorcycle racer for the Turkish Honda team. As son of a motorcycle dealer, he started racing in 1997 at the age of nineteen. 
Sinan Sofuoglu (born 15 July 1982, Adapazarı – 9 May 2008) was a successful Turkish motorcycle racer. Starting racing at 15, Sinan became drag champion in 1998. He continued his victories with championships won in Group B in 1999, and in Group A in the years 2001, 2002 and 2004. He finished the 2003 season in second. Sinan Sofuoğlu also won the Turkish championship in 2005. He had a single wild-card ride in the Turkish 250 cc round of Moto GP at Istanbul Park in April 2006, where he qualified 26th with a time of 2.05.532 and finished 19th (and last finisher) with an overall time of 40.44.241. He died on May 9, 2008, aftermath of severe injuries and traumas he suffered on the race track in Kocaeli during a training for the Turkey Motorcycle Championship.
Kenan Sofuoğlu (born 25 August 1984, Akyazı) is a Turkish former professional motorcycle racer, who won the highest number of Supersport World Championship titles – five, in 2007, 2010, 2012, 2015 and 2016.
Bahattin Sofuoğlu (born 19 August 2003, Adapazarı) is the third generation motorcycle racer of the Sofuoğlu Family.

References

 
Turkish families
Sportspeople from Adapazarı
People from Akyazı
Motorsport in Turkey